The 1947–48 season was the second season in FK Partizan's existence. This article shows player statistics and matches that the club played during the 1947–48 season.

Players

Friendlies

Competitions

Yugoslav First League

Matches

Yugoslav Cup

See also
 List of FK Partizan seasons

References

External links
 Official website
 Partizanopedia 1947-48  (in Serbian)

FK Partizan seasons
Partizan